The Ministry of Mines (abbreviated MOM) administers Burma's mineral resources extraction, production, and export policies.

Ministry of Mines was led by Myint Aung, who was appointed by President Thein Sein on 7 September 2012. The Ministry was organized as Ministry of Natural Resources and Environmental Conservation by combination of Ministry of Environmental Conservation and Forestry.

See also
 Cabinet of Burma

References

External links
 Official website

Mines
Myanmar
Mining in Myanmar